Tang Talkh or Tang-e Talkh may refer to:
 Tang Talkh 1
 Tang Talkh 2
 Tang Talkh-e Pagin
 Tang Talkh-e Shomilan